Clube Recreativo da Caála, commonly known as just Recreativo da Caála, is an Angolan football club based in Caála, a municipality 23 km to the province's capital city of Huambo.

History
CR Caála was founded on 24 June 1944 and competing in Angola's top level league, the Girabola.

The management of Recreativo da Caála dismissed on Monday [3 May] the Portuguese Victor Manuel as the coach of the football club.
Also according to the same source, the team also sacked the assistant coach Jorge Prisca and Fernando Pereira, goalkeepers coach.

Stadium
Recreativo da Caála is one of the few clubs in Angola's top division to own a football stadium, the Estádio Mártires da Canhala. The former 3,000 capacity stadium has been rehabilitated and expanded to 10,000-seats. It's reinauguration took place on 6 October 2013.

Achievements
Angola Cup
 Runners-up (1) : 2012

Recent seasons
C.R. Caála's season-by-season performance since 2011:

 PR = Preliminary round, 1R = First round, GS = Group stage, R32 = Round of 32, R16 = Round of 16, QF = Quarter-finals, SF = Semi-finals

League and cup positions

Performance in CAF competitions
CAF Champions League: 1 appearance
2011 – First Round
CAF Confederation Cup: 1 appearance
2013 – Second Round

Players and staff

Players

Staff

Manager history and performance

See also
 Girabola
 Gira Angola

References

External links
 Girabola.com profile
 Zerozero.pt profile
 Facebook profile
 Blog

Recreativo Caala
Huambo Province
Association football clubs established in 1944
1944 establishments in Angola